The Conservative Illusion is a 1959 book by the American political scientist M. Morton Auerbach. It is a critical review of what has been labeled "conservatism" in the United States, which Auerbach traces not to conservative thinkers, but to Plato, Augustine of Hippo and Edmund Burke. The book was written in response to America's post-war "New Conservatives" such as Russell Kirk, Reinhold Niebuhr, Peter Viereck and Will Herberg.

References

Further reading
 
 

1959 non-fiction books
American non-fiction books
Books critical of conservatism in the United States
Columbia University Press books